Shubra Aiyappa (born 24 April) is an Indian actress who has appeared in Tamil, Telugu and Kannada language films. After making her debut in the Telugu film Prathinidhi (2014), she went on to appear in Sagaptham (2015) and Vajrakaya (2015).

Before venturing into modeling and movies, she studied in Baldwin Girls High School, Bangalore.

Career
After breaking into modelling, Aiyappa appeared in several commercials before being signed on to appear in the Telugu film, Rey (2015), directed by YVS Chowdary. However Aiyappa later opted out of the venture, and signed on to make her acting debut in Prathinidhi (2014), portraying a journalist.

In 2015, Aiyappa appeared in Sagaptham, a Tamil film noted for its launch of Shanmugapandian, the son of actor-politician Vijayakanth. The film opened to poor reviews and Aiyappa's role was minimal She also made her first appearance in a Kannada film during the same year, portraying a guest role in Vajrakaya (2015). Her character appeared in the first fifteen minutes of the film and featured in a song, which was shot in Venice. The film opened to positive reviews and performed well at the box office, prompting further film offers for Aiyappa.

Currently working on a movie Ramana Avatara with actor Rishi.

Filmography

References

External links

Indian film actresses
Actresses in Tamil cinema
Actresses in Kannada cinema
Living people
Actresses from Bangalore
Actresses in Telugu cinema
21st-century Indian actresses
Year of birth missing (living people)